The John Russell House is a historic house at 904 Charlotte Street in Fordyce, Arkansas.  This single-story wood-frame house was built c. 1925, and is Dallas County's finest example of Craftsman architecture.  It has an outstanding porch whose roof is supported by four columns of geometrically arranged wooden members.  A horizontal tie beam between the inner columns supports a column up to the apex of the gable roof.

The house was listed on the National Register of Historic Places in 1983.

See also
National Register of Historic Places listings in Dallas County, Arkansas

References

Houses on the National Register of Historic Places in Arkansas
Houses completed in 1925
Houses in Dallas County, Arkansas
Buildings and structures in Fordyce, Arkansas
National Register of Historic Places in Dallas County, Arkansas